Chorrerón is a small town in Camajuaní, Villa Clara Province, Cuba. With a population of 614 it is classified as a rural town. Some nearby towns include Vega de Palma, Vega Alta, Tarafa, Taguayabón, San Benigno, Vueltas, and Oliver.

Education 
In the town there is one school, which is: 

 Isidro Glez Primary

Economy 
According at the DMPF of Camajuani, Chorrerón is a settlement linked to sources of employment or economic development.

References 

Populated places in Villa Clara Province
1703 establishments in North America
Populated places established in 1703
1703 establishments in the Spanish Empire